Plymouth Village is a neighborhood of St. Matthews, Kentucky a city in Jefferson County, Kentucky, United States. The population was 201 at the 2000 census.

History

Plymouth Village was incorporated as a city on September 17, 1956.  Until 2000 Plymouth Village was an independent Sixth Class city.

Geography
Plymouth Village is located at  (38.239770, -85.650708).

According to the United States Census Bureau, the city has a total area of 0.0 square miles (0.1 km2), all of it land.

Demographics
At the 2000 census there were 201 people in 105 households, including 51 families, in the city. The racial makeup of the city was 97.01% White, 0.50% from other races, and 2.49% from two or more races. Hispanic or Latino of any race were 2.99%.

Of the 105 households 20.0% had children under the age of 18 living with them, 33.3% were married couples living together, 13.3% had a female householder with no husband present, and 51.4% were non-families. 46.7% of households were one person and 31.4% were one person aged 65 or older. The average household size was 1.91 and the average family size was 2.67.

The age distribution was 19.4% under the age of 18, 4.0% from 18 to 24, 25.4% from 25 to 44, 16.9% from 45 to 64, and 34.3% 65 or older. The median age was 46 years. For every 100 females, there were 76.3 males. For every 100 females age 18 and over, there were 63.6 males.

The median household income was $41,750 and the median family income was $59,375. Males had a median income of $60,000 versus $40,000 for females. The per capita income for the city was $25,319. About 9.3% of families and 5.3% of the population were below the poverty line, including 9.8% of those under the age of eighteen and none of those sixty five or over.

References

Neighborhoods in Kentucky
Former municipalities in Kentucky
Populated places established in 1956
1956 establishments in Kentucky
Populated places disestablished in 2000
St. Matthews, Kentucky